St. Joseph County is the name of two counties in the United States:

 St. Joseph County, Indiana
 St. Joseph County, Michigan